Phaonia rufipalpis is a species of fly. Found in palaearctic Europe, it lives in deciduous woodlands of temperate regions.

References

Muscidae
Diptera of Europe
Insects described in 1835
Taxa named by Pierre-Justin-Marie Macquart